Şəbiyan (also, Shabian and Shabiyan) is a village and municipality in the Ismailli Rayon of Azerbaijan.  It has a population of 378.  The municipality consists of the villages of Şəbiyan, Bəhliyan, and Bilistan.

References 

Populated places in Ismayilli District